Scopula dysmorpha is a moth of the family Geometridae. It is found in Nigeria.

References

Endemic fauna of Nigeria
Moths described in 1915
dysmorpha
Insects of West Africa
Moths of Africa